These are the results for the girls' +63 kg event at the 2018 Summer Youth Olympics.

Results

Supatchanin Khamhaeng of Thailand originally finished first, but in November 2019, it was announced that she tested positive for a banned substance.

References

External links
 Results

Weightlifting at the 2018 Summer Youth Olympics
2018 in women's weightlifting